This is a list of earthquakes in 1904. Only magnitude 6.0 or greater earthquakes appear on the list. Exceptions to this are earthquakes which have caused death, injury or damage. Events which occurred in remote areas will be excluded from the list as they wouldn't have generated significant media interest. All dates are listed according to UTC time. The countries and their flags are noted as they would have appeared in this year for example the Dutch East Indies being present-day Indonesia. Once again activity was below average. 14 events reached a magnitude of 7.0+ this year. China had the majority of the death toll through an event in August causing 400 deaths.

Overall

By death toll 

 Note: At least 10 casualties

By magnitude 

 Note: At least 7.0 magnitude

Notable events

January

March

April

May

June

July

August

October

November

December

References 

1904
1904 earthquakes
1904